Daniel E. Ponder Jr. (born September 13, 1954) is an American politician. He was a member of the Georgia House of Representatives from 1996 to 2000. He is a member of the Republican party. In 2003, he received the Profile in Courage Award from the John F. Kennedy Library Foundation. He was elected mayor of Donalsonville, Georgia in 2013.

References

Living people
Republican Party members of the Georgia House of Representatives
1954 births
Mayors of places in Georgia (U.S. state)
Place of birth missing (living people)